is a Japanese journalist, television reporter, television personality, and former NHK Announcer.

Early years 
Udo was born in Ijūin Town (now Hioki City), Kagoshima Prefecture, Japan. At an early age she moved to Osaka, where she grew up. Failing to pass the entrance examination for Osaka University, she eventually went on to Kobe College instead. She was hired by NHK in 1991.

Her hobbies included reading, traveling and cooking. Also, she was a good kendo player and a licensee of the second grade of it from the All Japan Kendo Federation. She belonged to the kendo club when she was a junior and senior high school student.

Career
Spending a few years as a cub sports reporter at the NHK Osaka Branch, Udo moved to Tokyo and became a news anchor for NHK News Ohayō Nippon in 1994. She worked at Saturday Sports, Sunday Sports and NHK News 10 as an anchor. She was involved in live coverage works in sport events and Olympic games.

Udo hosted NHK's New Year's Eve music concert Kōhaku Uta Gassen in 2001, 2002 and 2003.

In 2006, Udo hosted an afternoon talk show Studio Park kara Konnichiwa.

In June 2007, Udo was moved to New York City as a correspondent. She stayed there for about two years and a half. She was promoted as Chief Announcer in June 2008.

Returning to Tokyo, Udo was appointed as a main presenter for Asaichi in 2010 with Yoshihiko Inohara, a member of V6, one of Japan's most popular pop groups. Targeted mainly at women in their 40s, the show dealt with a wide variety of themes, from information about health and money, to infertility problems, menopausal disorders and the problem of sexless relationships.

Udo played the role of the leading host for Kōhaku Uta Gassen in 2012, 2013, 2014 and 2015.

On March 30, 2018, Udo and Inohara left Asaichi, handing over to Yurie Omi and Hanamaru-Daikichi Hakata. She resigned from NHK on March 31.

Udo became news anchor of Nippon Television's nightly news program news zero in October 2018.

On November 9, 2019, Udo was a host of the national festival held to mark Emperor Naruhito's enthronement.

Filmography
Television
 Ten Urara (1998), narrator
 Sanadamaru (2016), narrator

Film
 Hit Me Anyone One More Time (2019), newscaster
 Last of the Wolves (2021), radio personality

Book
 Udouroku (Shinchosha, 2014) .

References

External links
 

|-

|-

1969 births
Living people
Japanese announcers
Japanese television personalities
Japanese television presenters
Japanese women television presenters
People from Kagoshima Prefecture
People from Osaka